Whizz Whizz Bang Bang is a BAFTA Scotland nominated Best Children's Programme on BBC television series that began airing the fifth of March, 2007. A licensed television format based on the New Zealand series Let's Get Inventin'. Presented by Greg Foot. It features a different child in each programme who has an invention idea and then the team, with the help of Ralph, tries to build it. Most attempts have been successful, although all ideas have had to be slightly changed to make them practical. Inventions have included a hover scooter, a hydraulic off-road wheel chair, basketball launcher, jet engine bed and an Air Guitar.

References

BBC children's television shows